Vikkiramam is a village in the Pattukkottai taluk of Thanjavur district, Tamil Nadu, India.

Demographics 

As per the 2001 census, Vikkiramam had a total population of 3824 with 1854 males and 1970 females. The sex ratio was 1063.

References 
விக்ரமம் கிராமம்
 

Villages in Thanjavur district